Tio pepe may refer to:
 Tío Pepe, the best-selling brand of sherry in the world
 Restaurant Mesón del Tío Pepe, located opposite the main entrance to La Marquesa National Park
 Tio Pepe, a stage play by Matthew Lopez, directed by Caitlin Moon, enacted at the 2008 Summer Play Festival